Norman Gene Thomas (May 1, 1930 - May 19, 2020) was an American astronomer and discoverer of minor planets.

He worked at Lowell Observatory using the blink comparator alongside Robert Burnham, Jr., author of the famous three-volume Celestial Handbook.

He is credited by the Minor Planet Center with the discovery of 55 numbered minor planets during 1964–1989, including the Apollo asteroids 4544 Xanthus and 4581 Asclepius, as well as the Amor asteroid 3352 McAuliffe.

The main-belt asteroid 2555 Thomas, discovered by Edward Bowell at Anderson Mesa Station in 1980, was named in his honor. Naming citation was published on 8 April 1982.

List of discovered minor planets

References

External links 
 Library of Congress Authorities – Thomas, N. G. (Norman Gene), 1930-, (n89615892)

1930 births
20th-century British astronomers
Discoverers of asteroids

2020 deaths